The Sumbawa tiger (Parantica philo) is a species of nymphalid butterfly in the Danainae family. It is endemic to Indonesia.

References

Parantica
Butterflies of Indonesia
Taxonomy articles created by Polbot
Butterflies described in 1895
Endemic fauna of Indonesia